These are the results of the men's K-1 slalom competition in canoeing at the 1996 Summer Olympics. The K-1 (kayak single) event is raced by one-man kayaks through a whitewater course. The venue for the 1996 Olympic competition was along the Toccoa/Ocoee River near the Georgia-Tennessee state line.

Medalists

Results
The 44 competitors each took two runs through the whitewater slalom course on July 28. The best result of the runs counted for the event.

References

1996 Summer Olympics official report Volume 3. p. 162. 
Sports-reference.com 1996 men's K-1 slalom results.
Wallechinsky, David and Jaime Loucky (2008). "Canoeing: Men's Kayak Slalom Singles". In The Complete Book of the Olympics: 2008 Edition. London: Aurum Press Limited. p. 485.

Men's Slalom K-1
Men's events at the 1996 Summer Olympics